Paul Paavela (13 April 1931 in Suojärvi - 19 May 1980 in Vihti) was a Finnish official and politician from the Social Democratic Party.
Pekkala was Minister of Finance from 1975–1976 and 1977–1979.

References 

|-

1931 births
1980 deaths
People from Suoyarvsky District
Social Democratic Party of Finland politicians
Ministers of Finance of Finland
20th-century Finnish lawyers